Puntarenas is a province of Costa Rica. It is located in the western part of the country, covering most of Costa Rica's Pacific Ocean coast, and it is the largest province in Costa Rica. Clockwise from the northwest it borders on the provinces Guanacaste, Alajuela, San José and Limón, and the neighbouring country of Panama.

Overview
The capital is Puntarenas. It is subdivided into 11 cantons.

Canton (Capital):
 Buenos Aires (Buenos Aires)
 Corredores (Ciudad Neily at Corredor district)
 Coto Brus (San Vito)
 Esparza (Esparza city at Espíritu Santo district)
 Garabito (Jacó)
 Golfito (Golfito)
 Montes de Oro (Miramar)
 Osa (Ciudad Cortés)
 Parrita (Parrita)
 Puntarenas (Puntarenas)
 Quepos (Quepos)
 Monteverde (Monteverde)
 Puerto Jiménez (Puerto Jiménez)

Notable places
 Jacó
 Manuel Antonio National Park
 Montezuma
 Monteverde
 San Lucas Island
 Coto 47
 Diquís spheres

References

External links

 
Provinces of Costa Rica